Elisabeth "Bep" du Mée (30 May 1914 – 23 December 2002) was a Dutch track and field sprinter. In 1932, she was part of the 4 × 100 m relay team that set a national record and barely made it to the 1932 Summer Olympics as due to the Depression the Dutch government refused to send the team to Los Angeles, and the tickets were bought thanks to local fundraising. du Mee's team finished in fourth place in 1932, clocking the same time (47.6 s) as the bronze medalists.

Two years later, du Mée earned a silver medal in the 4 × 100 m relay at the 1934 Women's World Games.

References

1914 births
2002 deaths
Dutch female sprinters
Athletes (track and field) at the 1932 Summer Olympics
Olympic athletes of the Netherlands
Athletes from Amsterdam
Olympic female sprinters